ABC transporter transmembrane domain is the main transmembrane structural unit of ATP-binding cassette transporter proteins, consisting of six alpha helixes that traverse the plasma membrane. Many members of the ABC transporter family have two such regions.

This family appears to correspond to ABC1 by TCDB classification.

Subfamilies
Sulphate ABC transporter permease protein 2 
Phosphate transport system permease protein 2 
Phosphonate uptake transporter 
Nitrate transport permease 
NifC-like ABC-type porter 
Phosphate ABC transporter, permease protein PstC 
Molybdate ABC transporter, permease protein 
Nickel ABC transporter, permease subunit NikB 
Nickel ABC transporter, permease subunit NikC 
Ectoine/hydroxyectoine ABC transporter, permease protein EhuD 
Ectoine/hydroxyectoine ABC transporter, permease protein EhuC

Human proteins containing this domain 
ABCB1;     ABCB10;    ABCB11;    ABCB4;     ABCB5;     ABCB6;     ABCB7;     ABCB8;
ABCB9;     ABCC1;     ABCC10;    ABCC11;    ABCC12;    ABCC13;    ABCC2;     ABCC3;
ABCC4;     ABCC5;     ABCC6;     ABCC8;     ABCC9;     CFTR;  
TAP1;      TAP2;      TAPL;

References

ATP-binding cassette transporters
Protein domains
Protein families